The twenty-third World Masters Athletics Championships were held in Málaga, Spain, from September 4–September 16, 2018. This was the second even year of the biennial championship as beginning in 2016 in Perth, Australia, the championships moved to be held in even numbered years. The World Masters Athletics Championships serve the division of the sport of athletics for people over 35 years of age, referred to as Masters athletics.

A full range of track and field events were held, along with a cross country race and a marathon.

Results
100 metres

All finals held on September 6, 2018

M35 100 metres

Wind: -0.2

M40 100 metres

Wind: -1.0

M45 100 metres

Wind: +0.3

M50 100 metres

Wind: -0.7

M55 100 metres

Wind: -0.5

M60 100 metres

Wind: -0.4

M65 100 metres

Wind: -3.4

M70 100 metres

Wind: -3.3

M75 100 metres

Wind: -2.6

M80 100 metres

Wind: -2.8

M85 100 metres

Wind: -3.4

M90 100 metres

Wind: -3.5

200 metres

All finals held on September 9, 2018

M35 200 metres

Wind: -1.3

M40 200 metres

Wind: -2.1

M45 200 metres

Wind: -1.2

M50 200 metres

Wind: -0.7

M55 200 metres

Wind: -0.5

M60 200 metres

Wind: -1.2

M65 200 metres

Wind: +0.3

M70 200 metres

Wind: -1.2

M75 200 metres

Wind: -0.9

M80 200 metres

Wind: -1.5

M85 200 metres

Wind: +0.1

M90 200 metres

Wind: -1.4

400 metres

All finals held on September 14, 2018

M35 400 metres

M40 400 metres

M45 400 metres

M50 400 metres

M55 400 metres

M60 400 metres

M65 400 metres

M70 400 metres

M75 400 metres

M80 400 metres

M85 400 metres

M90 400 metres

800 metres
All finals held September 11, 2018

M35 800 metres

M40 800 metres

M45 800 metres

M50 800 metres

M55 800 metres

M60 800 metres

M65 800 metres

M70 800 metres

M75 800 metres

M80 800 metres

M85 800 metres

M90 800 metres

M95 800 metres

1500 metres
All finals held September 16, 2018

M35 1500 metres

M40 1500 metres

M45 1500 metres

M50 1500 metres

M55 1500 metres

M60 1500 metres

M65 1500 metres

M70 1500 metres

M75 1500 metres

M80 1500 metres

M85 1500 metres

M90 1500 metres

M95 1500 metres

5000 metres
All finals held September 12, 2018

M35 5000 metres
41 athletes, 2 heats timed final.  All medalists came from heat 2

M40 5000 metres
51 athletes, 3 heats timed final. All medalists came from heat 3

M45 5000 metres
51 athletes, 3 heats timed final.  All medalists came from heat 3

M50 5000 metres
66 athletes, 3 heats timed final.  All medalists came from heat 3

M55 5000 metres
63 athletes, 3 heats timed final.  All medalists came from heat 3

M60 5000 metres
67 athletes, 3 heats timed final.  All medalists came from heat 3

M65 5000 metres
59 athletes, 3 heats timed final.  All medalists came from heat 3

M70 5000 metres
47 athletes, 2 heats timed final.  All medalists came from heat 2

M75 5000 metres
33 athletes, 2 heats timed final.  All medalists came from heat 2

M80 5000 metres

M85 5000 metres

M90 5000 metres

 8km Cross country running
Held September 05, 2018

M35 8km Cross country running
32 athletes

M40 8km Cross country running
50 athletes

M45 8km Cross country running
51 athletes

M50 8km Cross country running
71 athletes

M55 8km Cross country running
63 athletes

M60 8km Cross country running
72 athletes

M65 8km Cross country running
55 athletes

M70 6km Cross country running
55 athletes

M75 6km Cross country running
32 athletes

M80 6km Cross country running
20 athletes

M85 6km Cross country running

10 km road
Held September 09, 2018

M35 10 km road
56 athletes

M40 10 km road
72 athletes

M45 10 km road
76 athletes

M50 10 km road
85 athletes

M55 10 km road
59 athletes

M60 10 km road
83 athletes

M65 10 km road
47 athletes

M70 10 km road
41 athletes

M75 10 km road
23 athletes

M80 10 km road
13 athletes

M85 10 km road

M90 10 km road

Short hurdles
All finals held September 15, 2018

M35 110 metres hurdles
Wind: -0.7

M40 110 metres hurdles
Wind: -1.3

M45 110 metres hurdles
Wind: -1.5

M50 100 metres hurdles
Wind: -0.9

M55 100 metres hurdles
Wind: -0.6

M60 100 metres hurdles
Wind: -1.6

M65 100 metres hurdles
Wind: -1.5

M70 80 metres hurdles
Wind: -1.2

M75 80 metres hurdles
Wind: -1.2

M80 80 metres hurdles
Wind: +0.1

M85 80 metres hurdles
Wind: +0.4

Long hurdles
All finals held September 7, 2018

M35 400 metres hurdles

M40 400 metres hurdles

M45 400 metres hurdles

M50 400 metres hurdles

M55 400 metres hurdles

M60 300 metres hurdles

M65 300 metres hurdles

M70 300 metres hurdles

M75 300 metres hurdles

M80 200 metres hurdles
Wind: -0.8

M85 200 metres hurdles
Wind: -0.4

Steeplechase
Held September 7, 2018

M35 3000 metres steeplechase
17 athletes, 1 heat.

M40 3000 metres steeplechase
17 athletes, 1 heat.

M45 3000 metres steeplechase
22 athletes, 1 heat.

M50 3000 metres steeplechase
28 athletes, 2 timed heats. All medalists ran in heat 2

M55 3000 metres steeplechase
24 athletes, 2 timed heats.

M60 2000 metres steeplechase
25 athletes, 2 timed heats.

M65 2000 metres steeplechase
24 athletes, 2 timed heats. All medalists ran in heat 2

M70 2000 metres steeplechase
19 athletes, 1 heat

M75 2000 metres steeplechase
11 athletes

M80 2000 metres steeplechase

 Rule 169.7 is noted in the results but no disqualification indicated.  Rule 169.7 defines properly clearing the water jump.

M85 2000 metres steeplechase

 Rule 169.7 is noted in the results but no disqualification indicated.  Rule 169.7 defines properly clearing the water jump.

4x100 metres relay
All relays September 16, 2018

M35 4x100 metres relay
11 teams, 2 heats timed final

M40 4x100 metres relay
12 teams, 2 heats timed final

M45 4x100 metres relay
7 teams

M50 4x100 metres relay
12 teams, 2 heats as timed finals

M55 4x100 metres relay
10 teams, 2 heats as timed finals, all medalists came from heat 1

M60 4x100 metres relay
9 teams

M65 4x100 metres relay
5 teams

M70 4x100 metres relay
7 teams

M75 4x100 metres relay
8 teams

M80 4x100 metres relay

M85 4x100 metres relay

4x400 metres relay
All relays September 16, 2018

M35 4x400 metres relay
12 teams, 2 heats timed final

M40 4x400 metres relay
9 teams

M45 4x400 metres relay
8 teams

M50 4x400 metres relay
11 teams, 2 heats timed final

M55 4x400 metres relay
9 teams

M60 4x400 metres relay
10 teams, 2 heats timed final, all medalists came from heat 1

M65 4x400 metres relay
7 teams

M70 4x400 metres relay
6 teams

M75 4x400 metres relay
6 teams

M80 4x400 metres relay
5 teams

M85 4x400 metres relay
2 teams

High Jump

M35 High Jump
September 9, 2018

M40 High Jump
September 10, 2018, 16 athletes

M45 High Jump
September 10, 2018, 22 athletes

M50 High Jump
September 10, 2018, 35 athletes, 2 flights. All medalists come from flight 2.

M55 High Jump
September 10, 2018, 32 athletes, 2 flights.  All medalists come from flight 2.

M60 High Jump
September 9, 2018, 17 athletes

M65 High Jump
September 9, 2018, 23 athletes, 2 flights.  All medalists come from flight 2.

M70 High Jump
September 9, 2018, 13 athletes

M75 High Jump
September 9, 2018, 18 athletes

M80 High Jump
September 9, 2018, 13 athletes.

M85 High Jump
September 9, 2018, 12 athletes.

M90 High Jump
September 9, 2018

Pole Vault

M35 Pole Vault
September 11, 2018, 8 athletes

M40 Pole Vault
September 11, 2018, 14 athletes

M45 Pole Vault
September 11, 2018, 16 athletes

M50 Pole Vault
September 11, 2018, 16 athletes

M55 Pole Vault
September 12, 2018, 18 athletes

M60 Pole Vault
September 12, 2018, 13 athletes

M65 Pole Vault
September 11, 2018, 17 athletes

M70 Pole Vault
September 12, 2018, 12 athletes

M75 Pole Vault
September 12, 2018, 13 athletes

M80 Pole Vault
September 12, 2018, 9 athletes

M85 Pole Vault
September 12, 2018, 6 athletes

Long Jump

M35 Long Jump
24 athletes. Two flights and final on September 10, 2018

M40 Long Jump
37 athletes.  Two flights and final on September 9, 2018

M45 Long Jump
35 athletes.  2 flights and final on September 9, 2018

Capape took second based on second best jump, 6.07 (twice) to Kuhnert 6.06

M50 Long Jump
37 athletes.  Two flights and final on September 9, 2018

M55 Long Jump
31 athletes.  Two flights and final on September 9, 2018

M60 Long Jump
40 athletes.  Two flights and final on September 10, 2018

M65 Long Jump
September 11, 2018

M70 Long Jump
12 athletes. One flight and final on September 10, 2018

M75 Long Jump
21 athletes. One flight and final on September 10, 2018

M80 Long Jump
20 athletes on September 11, 2018

M85 Long Jump
13 athletes on September 11, 2018

M90 Long Jump
September 11, 2018

M100 Long Jump
September 11, 2018

Triple Jump

M35 Triple Jump
10 athletes. One flight and final on September 15, 2018

M40 Triple Jump
21 athletes.  One flight and final on September 15, 2018

M45 Triple Jump
28 athletes.  2 flights and final on September 15, 2018

M50 Triple Jump
20 athletes. One flight and final on September 15, 2018

M55 Triple Jump
28 athletes.  Two flights and final on September 15, 2018

M60 Triple Jump
22 athletes.  One flight and final on September 15, 2018

M65 Triple Jump
19 athletes. One flight and final on September 15, 2018

M70 Triple Jump
14 athletes. One flight and final on September 12, 2018

M75 Triple Jump
15 athletes. One flight and final on September 12, 2018

M80 Triple Jump
11 athletes on September 12, 2018

M85 Triple Jump
9 athletes on September 12, 2018

M90 Triple Jump
September 12, 2018

M100 Triple Jump
September 12, 2018

Shot Put

M35 Shot Put
20 athletes, 1 flight and final held on September 6, 2018

M40 Shot Put
September 6, 2018

M45 Shot Put
20 athletes, 1 flight and final held on September 6, 2018

M50 Shot Put
32 athletes, 2 flights and final held on September 6, 2018

M55 Shot Put
25 athletes, 2 flights and final held on September 6, 2018

M60 Shot Put
26 athletes, 2 flights and final held on September 5, 2018

M65 Shot Put
September 4, 2018

M70 Shot Put
September 4, 2018

M75 Shot Put
September 4, 2018

M80 Shot Put
September 4, 2018

M85 Shot Put
September 4, 2018

M90 Shot Put
September 4, 2018

Discus Throw

M35 Discus Throw
25 athletes, 2 flights and final held on September 9, 2018

M40 Discus Throw
16 athletes, 1 flight and final September 9, 2018

M45 Discus Throw
25 athletes, 2 flights and final held on September 9, 2018

M50 Discus Throw
32 athletes, 2 flights and final held on September 9, 2018

M55 Discus Throw
37 athletes, 2 flights and final held on September 9, 2018

M60 Discus Throw
47 athletes, 2 flights and final held on September 9, 2018

Hosek equalled Rastelli's 3rd round throw of 50.79 on his final attempt.  The tiebreaker was Rastelli's 2nd best throw of 50.52, to Hosek's 47.51

M65 Discus Throw
37 athletes, 2 flights and final held on September 7, 2018

M70 Discus Throw
28 athletes, 2 flights and final held on September 7, 2018

M75 Discus Throw
19 athletes, one flight and final September 7, 2018

M80 Discus Throw
16 athletes, one flight and final September 7, 2018

M85 Discus Throw
16 athletes, one flight and final September 7, 2018

M90 Discus Throw
7 Athletes, one flight and final September 7, 2018

Hammer Throw

M35 Hammer Throw
15 athletes, 1 flight and final held on September 4, 2018

M40 Hammer Throw
17 athletes, 1 flight and final held on September 4, 2018

M45 Hammer Throw
12 athletes, 1 flight and final held on September 4, 2018

M50 Hammer Throw
25 athletes, 2 flights and final held on September 4, 2018

M55 Hammer Throw
26 athletes, 2 flights and final held on September 4, 2018

M60 Hammer Throw
28 athletes, 2 flights and final held on September 4, 2018

M65 Hammer Throw
19 athletes, 1 flight and final held on September 4, 2018

M70 Hammer Throw
20 athletes, 1 flight and final held on September 4, 2018

M75 Hammer Throw
14 athletes, 1 flight and final held on September 6, 2018

M80 Hammer Throw
18 athletes, 1 flight and final held on September 6, 2018

M85 Hammer Throw
15 athletes, 1 flight and final held on September 6, 2018

M90 Hammer Throw
5 athletes, 1 flight and final held on September 6, 2018

Javelin Throw

M35 Javelin Throw
18 athletes, 1 flight and final held on September 11, 2018

M40 Javelin Throw
17 athletes, 1 flight and final held on September 11, 2018

M45 Javelin Throw
23 athletes, 2 flights and final held on September 11, 2018

M50 Javelin Throw
41 athletes, 2 flights and final held on September 12, 2018

M55 Javelin Throw
37 athletes, 2 flights and final held on September 12, 2018

M60 Javelin Throw
31 athletes, 2 flights and final held on September 12, 2018

M65 Javelin Throw
29 athletes, 2 flights and final held on September 12, 2018

M70 Javelin Throw
17 athletes, 1 flight and final held on September 12, 2018

M75 Javelin Throw
21 athletes, 1 flight and final held on September 10, 2018

M80 Javelin Throw
17 athletes, 1 flight and final held on September 10, 2018

M85 Javelin Throw
15 athletes, 1 flight and final held on September 10, 2018

M90 Javelin Throw
7 athletes, 1 flight and final held on September 10, 2018

Weight Throw

M35 Weight Throw
15 athletes, 1 flight and final held on September 11, 2018

M40 Weight Throw
9 athletes, 1 flight and final held on September 11, 2018

M45 Weight Throw
16 athletes, 1 flight and final held on September 11, 2018

M50 Weight Throw
21 athletes, 1 flight and final held on September 11, 2018

M55 Weight Throw
25 athletes, 2 flights and final held on September 11, 2018

M60 Weight Throw
27 athletes, 2 flights and final held on September 11, 2018

M65 Weight Throw
23 athletes, 2 flights and final held on September 11, 2018

M70 Weight Throw
24 athletes, 2 flights and final held on September 11, 2018

M75 Weight Throw
13 athletes, 1 flight and final held on September 11, 2018

M80 Weight Throw
17 athletes, 1 flight and final held on September 10, 2018

M85 Weight Throw
14 athletes, 1 flight and final held on September 10, 2018

M90 Weight Throw
6 athletes, 1 flight and final held on September 10, 2018

Throws Pentathlon

M35 Throws Pentathlon
13 athletes, held on September 14, 2018

M40 Throws Pentathlon
16 athletes, held on September 14, 2018

M45 Throws Pentathlon
19 athletes, held on September 14, 2018

M50 Throws Pentathlon
28 athletes, held on September 13, 2018

M55 Throws Pentathlon
31 athletes, held on September 14, 2018

M60 Throws Pentathlon
28 athletes, held on September 13, 2018

M65 Throws Pentathlon
28 athletes, held on September 14, 2018

M70 Throws Pentathlon
27 athletes, held on September 15, 2018

M75 Throws Pentathlon
13 athletes, held on September 15, 2018

M80 Throws Pentathlon
14 athletes, held on September 12, 2018

M85 Throws Pentathlon
11 athletes, held on September 12, 2018

M90 Throws Pentathlon
5 athletes, held on September 12, 2018

Decathlon

M35 Decathlon
20 athletes, held on September 4–5, 2018

M40 Decathlon
28 athletes, held on September 4–5, 2018

M45 Decathlon
27 athletes, held on September 4–5, 2018

M50 Decathlon
40 athletes, held on September 4–5, 2018

M55 Decathlon
37 athletes, held on September 6–7, 2018

M60 Decathlon
30 athletes, held on September 6–7, 2018

M65 Decathlon
15 athletes, held on September 6–7, 2018

M70 Decathlon
16 athletes, held on September 6–7, 2018

M75 Decathlon
11 athletes, held on September 6–7, 2018

M80 Decathlon
6 athletes, held on September 4–5, 2018

M85 Decathlon
4 athletes, held on September 4–5, 2018

5000 metres Racewalk
Held September 6, 2018

M35 5000 metres Racewalk
8 athletes

M40 5000 metres Racewalk
19 athletes

M45 5000 metres Racewalk
29 athletes

M50 5000 metres Racewalk
31 athletes

M55 5000 metres Racewalk
22 athletes

M60 5000 metres Racewalk
19 athletes

M65 5000 metres Racewalk
21 athletes

M70 5000 metres Racewalk
26 athletes

M75 5000 metres Racewalk
13 athletes

M80 5000 metres Racewalk
13 athletes

M85 5000 metres Racewalk

M90 5000 metres Racewalk

10 km road Racewalk
Held September 10, 2018

M35 10 km road Racewalk
13  athletes

M40 10 km road Racewalk
19 athletes

M45 10 km road Racewalk
25 athletes

M50 10 km road Racewalk
35 athletes

M55 10 km road Racewalk
28 athletes

M60 10 km road Racewalk
30 athletes

M65 10 km road Racewalk
36 athletes

M70 10 km road Racewalk
37 athletes

M75 10 km road Racewalk
22 athletes

M80 10 km road Racewalk
10 athletes

M85 10 km road Racewalk

M90 10 km road Racewalk

20 km road Racewalk
Held September 15, 2018

M35 20 km road Racewalk
7  athletes

M40 20 km road Racewalk
17 athletes

M45 20 km road Racewalk
19 athletes

M50 20 km road Racewalk
29 athletes

M55 20 km road Racewalk
28 athletes

M60 20 km road Racewalk
21  athletes

M65 20 km road Racewalk
29 athletes

M70 20 km road Racewalk
20 athletes

M75 20 km road Racewalk
11 athletes

M80 20 km road Racewalk
7 athletes

M85 20 km road Racewalk

See also
2018 World Masters Athletics Championships Women

References

World Masters Athletics Championships
International athletics competitions hosted by Spain
World Masters Athletics Championships
World Masters Athletics Championships